Ronald Haxton Girdwood  (19 March 1917 – 25 April 2006) was a Scottish physician, Professor of Therapeutics at the University of Edinburgh and a President of the Royal College of Physicians of Edinburgh. He undertook research into megaloblastic anaemia and was awarded a gold medal for his MD thesis. He was Dean of the Faculty of Medicine at the University of Edinburgh from 1975 to 1982 and oversaw the expansion of the medical school. He was a member of the Committee on Safety of Medicines. He was elected a member of the Aesculapian Club in 1965. He was elected a Fellow of the Royal Society of Edinburgh in 1978 and awarded a CBE in 1985.

References

1917 births
2006 deaths
20th-century Scottish medical doctors
Academics of the University of Edinburgh
Commanders of the Order of the British Empire
Presidents of the Royal College of Physicians of Edinburgh
Fellows of the Royal Society of Edinburgh
Fellows of the Royal College of Physicians
Fellows of the Royal College of Physicians of Edinburgh
Fellows of the Royal College of Pathologists
Fellows of the Royal College of Physicians of Ireland